Barbara Faith de Covarrubias (February 19, 1921 – October 10, 1995), was an American writer of more than 40 romance novels as Barbara Faith (her maiden name) from 1978 until the day of her death. She won a RITA Award in 1982.

Biography
Barbara Faith was born on February 19, 1921, in Cleveland, Ohio. She married former bullfighter Alfonso Covarrubias, on November 11, 1970.  They later renewed their vows in Spain on May 6, 1983. She began work as a public relations person in Miami, Florida and later moved to Chula Vista, California.  She later moved to San Miguel de Allende in Mexico.

She published her first novel in 1978 for Silhouette Books. Most of her books are set in Mexico, Spain, United States or Morocco, and many of the male protagonists of her books are Hispanic. She won a RITA Award in 1982.

Awards
The Sun Dancers: 1982 Rita Awards Best Novel winner

Bibliography

Single novels
Kill Me Gently Darling (1978)
Choices of the Heart (1980)
The Moonkissed (1980)
The Sun Dancers (1981)
Enchanted Dawn (1982)
The Promise of Summer (1983)
Wind Whispers (1984)
Awake to Splendor (1985)
Islands in Turquoise (1985)
Tomorrow Is Forever (1986)
Sing Me a Lovesong (1986)
Return to Summer (1986)
Kiss of the Dragon (1987)
Asking for Trouble (1987)
Say Hello Again (1988)
Beyond Forever (1988)
In a Rebel's Arms (1989)
Heather on the Hill (1989)
Capricorn Moon (1989)
Danger in Paradise (1990)
Lord of the Desert (1990)
Echoes of Summer (1991)
Mr. Macho Meets His Match (1991)
The Matador (1992)
Queen of Hearts (1992)
Gamblin' Man (1992)
This Above All (1993)
Cloud Man (1993)
A Silence of Dreams (1993)
Midnight Man (1993)
Dark, Dark My Lover's Eyes (1994)
Moonlight Lady (1995)
Scarlet Woman (1995)
Long-Lost Wife? (1996)

Morocco's Desert Series
Bedouin Bride (1984)
Desert Song (1986)
Flower of the Desert (1988)

Man of the World Series Multi-Author
3. Lion of the Desert (1991)

Romantic Traditions Series Multi-Author
Desert Man (1994)

That's My Baby! Series Multi-Author
Happy Father's Day (1996)

Omnibus in collaboration
Summer Sizzlers 1988 (1988) (with Joan Hohl and Billie Green)
Summer Sizzlers: Men of Summer (1996) (with Kathleen Eagle and Joan Hohl)
Flower of the Desert + By the Sheikh's Command by Debbi Rawlins (2006)

References

1921 births
1995 deaths
American romantic fiction writers
RITA Award winners
People from Chula Vista, California
20th-century American novelists
American women novelists
20th-century American women writers
Women romantic fiction writers
Novelists from California